Steven Mark Firth (born 1 February 1965 in Halifax, England) is the bass guitarist for the English band Embrace.

He studied art at Liverpool University, and also completed a psychology degree.

Firth admitted that he only found out about Embrace by chance, as he was looking in the music adverts section of a local paper as an old habit and had temporarily given up due to several failures in bands. He replaced the band's original bass player J Senior in 1995. 

In spite of the band's affiliation with football through the release of the 2006 World Cup song, Steve is believed to be the only member of the band who is largely interested, and supports Leeds United. He also holds an affinity for Leicester City

Firth is also a founding member and bassist of Land Sharks, formed in 2018. The band also features Embrace drummer Mike Heaton.

In 2018, Steve Firth joined forces with Preston-based songwriter, Mark Whiteside [Evil Blizzard] to record album “Between Light and Space” under Mark’s pre-existing solo project, One Sided Horse. Embrace members Richard McNamara, Mike Heaton and Mickey Dale also featured on the album which was also produced by Mickey Dale and released on UK Independent Label, Butterfly Effect.

References

 

1965 births
Living people
People from Halifax, West Yorkshire
English bass guitarists
English male guitarists
Male bass guitarists